The twenty-third season of British science fiction television series Doctor Who, known collectively as The Trial of a Time Lord, aired in weekly episodes from 6 September to 6 December 1986. It contained four adventures: The Mysterious Planet, Mindwarp, Terror of the Vervoids and The Ultimate Foe; the season also marked the final regular appearance of Colin Baker as the Sixth Doctor.

The idea for the serial stemmed from several production changes to Doctor Who, such as reduced screen time for the season and an instruction from BBC1 controller Michael Grade that the series needed to contain less violence and more humour. Several problems occurred during production, including the death of scriptwriter Robert Holmes and the resignation of script editor Eric Saward. When it ended, Baker was dismissed from the role on the orders of Grade. John Nathan-Turner produced the series.

Synopsis
In the serial, the Sixth Doctor is tried by the High Council of Time Lords for breaking several of the laws of Gallifrey, the Time Lords' home world, including interference with outside worlds and genocide. A mysterious character called the Valeyard acts as prosecutor. In the first two chapters (The Mysterious Planet and Mindwarp) events from the Doctor's past and present are submitted as evidence of his guilt. The third chapter (Terror of the Vervoids) presents future events in the Doctor's defence. In the concluding chapter (The Ultimate Foe) the Doctor's trial is halted, and the Doctor confronts the Valeyard and his old rival, the Master, in order to clear his name and to save the High Council.

Casting

Main cast 
 Colin Baker as the Sixth Doctor
 Nicola Bryant as Peri Brown
 Bonnie Langford as Melanie Bush

Colin Baker makes his final appearance as the Doctor in this longest-running serial before being dismissed from the role by the BBC.
Nicola Bryant departs as Peri Brown in Mindwarp.
Bonnie Langford makes her debut as the Doctor's future companion Melanie Bush in Terror of the Vervoids.

Recurring stars 
 Michael Jayston as the Valeyard
 Lynda Bellingham as the Inquisitor
 Anthony Ainley as The Master
 Tony Selby as Sabalom Glitz

Michael Jayston and Lynda Bellingham both appeared throughout the whole serial. Tony Selby appeared in The Mysterious Planet and The Ultimate Foe, while Anthony Ainley returned as the Master in The Ultimate Foe.

Serials

The series remained at once-weekly Saturday broadcasts. All episodes were 25 minutes long, with the exception of Part 14, which ran for just under 30 minutes.  This running time was the result of a plea by John Nathan-Turner to his superiors at the BBC that the serial's final episode needed the additional three minutes to conclude the story properly. Although there were now 14 episodes in the season, the total running time was overall reduced since the episodes were just over half as long.

Preproduction

Original Season 23

The change of format that Doctor Who had undergone in Season 22 (45-minute episodes, moving back to one episode per week on Saturday evenings) had been reasonably successful, with ratings around the 6–8 million mark. As such, the production team began preparations for Season 23 in the same format, with a total of 13 episodes spread over six stories, with five 2-episode serials and one of three episodes. A number of storylines were submitted, with six eventually being commissioned between September 1984 and February 1985. However, in the latter month, the BBC announced that, as a cost-cutting measure owing to the costs of several large projects (not least of which was the launch of EastEnders), Season 23 was being put back from its planned transmission in January 1986 to the following September, which would be a different financial year.

Planned serials

Revised Season 23

Although Doctor Who had been recommissioned, it yet again underwent a format change, with episodes reduced in length back to 25 minutes, and the full season running to only 14 episodes (a total of 350 minutes' running time), which worked out at almost half the total of Season 22. As a consequence, the production team were forced to abandon the various serials that had been commissioned for the original Season 23, and instead come up with something new. John Nathan-Turner and Eric Saward eventually came up with the idea of having the various serials linked with an overarching narrative—this led to the conception of a trial story with a Christmas Carol-inspired "past, present, and future" storyline, thereby stretching the length of the season. The planned 14-part serial was intended to be divided into a pair of 4-part stories followed by a 6-part one. By July 1985, the characters of the Valeyard, the Inquisitor and Mel were conceived.

Production
Robert Holmes was commissioned to write the first and final chapters of the serial. His draft of the first chapter, The Mysterious Planet, was criticised by BBC Head of Series and Serials, Jonathan Powell, for its comedic content, contradicting the BBC controller's request for a more humorous series – which took away confidence from Holmes.

The second chapter, Mindwarp, was written by Philip Martin., whose character Sil, introduced in the previous season's Vengeance on Varos, was popular among the production team, who asked Martin to feature the character in the ultimately-cancelled story Mission to Magnus. Nathan-Turner asked Martin to include Sil in his chapter, and asked confidentially for Peri to be killed in accordance with Bryant's wishes to leave the show with a bang.

The third chapter was originally to be interlinked with the fourth. Holmes was originally asked to write it, but declined, citing a dislike of six-part serials. After rejecting submissions by Christopher H. Bidmead and PJ Hammond, Nathan-Turner approached husband-and-wife writing team Pip and Jane Baker to write a studio-based serial, Terror of the Vervoids.

Holmes was unable to finish writing the fourth chapter, originally called Time Inc., before his death from a liver illness and Hepatitis B on 24 May 1986, aged 59. The Bakers were commissioned by Nathan-Turner, at short notice, to write a new version of the episode, after script editor Eric Saward withdrew his permission for his original version of Part 14 to be used: the original ending would have featured a fight to the death in a time vent, between the Doctor and the Valeyard, as part of a cliff-hanger ending to the season, which horrified Nathan-Turner, as he feared that to use such a downbeat ending would have provided an excuse for the BBC management to cancel the series altogether. Subsequently the title was later changed to The Ultimate Foe.

Filming of the serial began on 7 April 1986 and ended on 14 August that year. The outdoor sequences in The Mysterious Planet were filmed in mid-April in Queen Elizabeth Country Park, and studio work followed on 24 April and 10 May. Studio work for Mindwarp took place from 27–29 May and 11–13 June, and location shots were filmed in Brighton from 15–16 June. Terror of the Vervoids and The Ultimate Foe were produced simultaneously; production began with location filming for the latter in late June, before returning to the studio to film scenes for both chapters on 16–17 July. Terror of the Vervoids was the last chapter to be completed, with studio work taking place from 30 July–1 August and from 12–14 August.

Reception and analysis
Public reaction to The Trial of a Time Lord was mixed. Although the Audience Appreciation figures had improved since the previous season — the lowest figure was 66% for Parts Seven and Nine and the highest was 72% for Parts One, Four and Eight.— the viewing figures were lower.

Reviews
The Trial of a Time Lord received mixed reviews from Doctor Who critics. Paul Cornell, Martin Day and Keith Topping, co-authors of The Discontinuity Guide, wrote that as a whole, the serial's plot 'hangs together remarkably well'. David J. Howe and Stephen James Walker, authors of Doctor Who: The Television Companion, disagreed, arguing that the serial was a 'monumental wasted opportunity'. They disapproved of the trial storyline, being unconvinced that a prosecutor 'in any reasonable legal system' would be allowed to modify charges and court proceedings mid-trial. However, they did find the meta-humour of 'the Doctor effectively sitting down to watch Doctor Who for fourteen weeks' amusing if repetitive, and praised Baker's acting. Both reviews found that the trial scenes detracted from the chapter story arcs.

Reviews of the individual chapters were also mixed. Although appreciative of the acting of Brian Blessed in Mindwarp, Cornell, Day and Topping argued that the script lacked focus, '[trying] to be comic, grotesque, straight, and farcical all at the same time'. Howe and Walker were more favourable towards the script, citing the re-appearance of Sil as positive, and hailing Peri's off-screen death as 'one of the most dramatic and impressive moments of the entire season' and Bryant's best scene since The Caves of Androzani. Both reviews judged Terror of the Vervoids to be a well-written story, although Cornell, Day and Topping criticised the dialogue, and Howe and Walker were unimpressed by Bonnie Langford in her performance as Melanie Bush.

Broadcast
The Trial of a Time Lord was broadcast from 6 September to 6 December 1986.

Home media

VHS releases

DVD and Blu-ray releases

In print

Notes
 Although the following serial Time and the Rani was the Sixth Doctor's final appearance, Baker declined an offer to return either for the entire story (as originally offered) or solely for a regeneration scene, and the part was instead portrayed by Sylvester McCoy wearing a blond wig.

References

Bibliography

 
 .
 .
 .
 .
 

1986 British television seasons
1986 British television episodes
Season 23
Season 23
23
Fiction with unreliable narrators
Television courtroom dramas